"The Right Left Hand" is a song written by J. Harold Meeks, Dennis Knutson and A.L. "Doodle" Owens, and recorded by American country music artist George Jones. It was released in January 1987 as the second single from his album Wine Colored Roses. The song peaked at number 8 on the Billboard Hot Country Singles chart.

Content
The song is about marriage; the narrator rejoices at putting "a golden band on the right left hand" after several failed marriages.  Many interpreted the song as George's tribute to his fourth wife Nancy, whom he credited with saving his life and career.  Jones would not see the Top 10 again until late 1988.

Chart performance

References 

1987 singles
George Jones songs
Epic Records singles
Songs written by A.L. "Doodle" Owens
Song recordings produced by Billy Sherrill
Songs written by Dennis Knutson
1986 songs